Stormont—Dundas—South Glengarry (formerly Stormont—Dundas and Stormont—Dundas—Charlotenburgh) is a federal electoral district in Ontario, Canada, that has been represented in the House of Commons of Canada since 1968.

Geography
The district includes the United Counties of Stormont, Dundas and Glengarry, excluding the Township of North Glengarry.

History
The electoral district was created in 2003, from the Stormont—Dundas—Charlottenburgh and Glengarry—Prescott—Russell districts.  In turn, the Stormont-Dundas-Charlottenburgh district was formed from the Stormont-Dundas district.

Stormont—Dundas was a federal electoral district from 1968 to 1999. The riding was created in 1966 from parts of Stormont and Grenville—Dundas ridings.

It initially consisted of the County of Stormont including the City of Cornwall, and the townships of Williamsburg and Winchester (in the County of Dundas). In 1976, it was redefined to consist of all of the counties of Dundas and Stormont, and the Township of Charlottenburgh in Glengarry County, but excluding the Village of Lancaster. In 1987, it was redefined to consist of the counties of Dundas and Stormont, excluding Akwesasne Indian Reserve No. 59.  In 1996, it was redefined to include the Township of Charlottenburgh and Akwesasne Indian Reserve No. 59.

The electoral district's name was changed in 1999 to Stormont—Dundas—Charlottenburgh. It was represented in the House of Commons of Canada from 1997 to 2004, and in the Legislative Assembly of Ontario from 1999 to 2007. It consisted of parts of the United Counties of Stormont, Dundas and Glengarry: the Township of Charlottenburgh (Glengarry County), the counties of Dundas and Stormont, and Akwesasne Indian Reserve No. 59.

Stormont—Dundas—South Glengarry was created in 2003: 91.5% of it came from Stormont—Dundas—Charlottenburgh, and 4.9% from Glengarry—Prescott—Russell ridings.

This riding was unchanged during the 2012 electoral redistribution.

Member of Parliament

This riding has elected the following Member of Parliament:

Election results

Stormont—Dundas—South Glengarry, 2004–present

Stormont—Dundas—Charlottenburgh, 2000–2004

Stormont—Dundas, 1968–2000

|}

|}

|}

   
|}

|}

|}

|}

 
|}

 
|}

References

Notes

External links
Riding history from the Library of Parliament
 2011 results from Elections Canada
 Campaign expense data from Elections Canada

Cornwall, Ontario
Ontario federal electoral districts